Cold Call is a four-part television miniseries starring Sally Lindsay, Daniel Ryan, Paul Higgins, Elizabeth Counsell and Taj Atwal. It was produced by Acorn TV and broadcast on Channel 5 on four consecutive nights from 18 November to 21 November 2019. The series revolves around June Clark (played by Lindsay), an ordinary woman, who is scammed by a cold caller. She then tracks down the fraudster (Higgins) and begins working for him in order to bring him to justice.

References

External links
 

2019 British television series debuts
2019 British television series endings
2010s British drama television series
2010s British television miniseries
Channel 5 (British TV channel) original programming
English-language television shows